The 2006 Brasil Open was an ATP Tour men's tennis tournament held in Costa do Sauipe resort, Mata de São João, Brazil and played on outdoor clay courts. It was the sixth edition of the tournament and was held from 20 to 27 February 2006. Nicolás Massú won the singles title.

Singles main draw entrants

Seeds

1 Rankings as of 20 February 2006.

Other entrants
The following players received wildcards into the main draw:
  André Ghem
  Ricardo Mello
  André Sá

The following players received entry from the qualifying draw:
  Nicolás Almagro
  Juan Martín del Potro
  Daniel Gimeno Traver
  Olivier Patience

The following players received entry as lucky losers:
  Iván Navarro Pastor
  Albert Portas

The following player received entry due to a protected ranking:
  Gustavo Kuerten

Withdrawals
Before the tournament
  Agustín Calleri (replaced by Portas)
  Mariano Zabaleta (replaced by Navarro Pastor)

Doubles main draw entrants

Seeds

Other entrants
The following pairs received wildcards into the main draw:
  Gustavo Kuerten /  André Sá
  Ricardo Mello /  Flávio Saretta

The following pairs received entry as alternates:
  Francesco Aldi /  Alessio di Mauro
  Nicolás Almagro /  Sergio Roitman

Champions

Singles

 Nicolás Massú defeated  Alberto Martín 6–3, 6–4
 It was Massú's only title of the year and the 7th of his career.

Doubles

 Lukáš Dlouhý /  Pavel Vízner defeated  Mariusz Fyrstenberg /  Marcin Matkowski 6–1, 4–6, [10–3]
 It was Dlouhý's 1st title of the year and the 1st of his career. It was Vízner's 1st title of the year and the 10th of his career.

References

External links
 Official Results Archive (ATP)
 Official Results Archive (ITF)
 Singles Draw (ATP)
 Doubles Draw (ATP)

 
Brasil Open
Brasil Open